Nymfes ( meaning nymphs) is a village in the northern part of the island of Corfu, Greece.  It was the seat of the municipality of Thinali.  In 2011 its population was 642 for the village and 995 for the community, which includes the village Platonas. Nymfes is situated in green hills, 4 km from the coast, and is home to Corfu's only waterfall. It is 3 km west of Episkepsi and 19 km northwest of Corfu (city).

Population

See also
List of settlements in the Corfu regional unit

References

External links
 Nymfes at the GTP Travel Pages

Populated places in Corfu (regional unit)